Mark Nielsen (born September 27, 1968) is an Australian business executive who is the global CEO of Talent.

Early life and career 
Nielsen was born in Johannesburg, South Africa and completed a Bachelor of Commerce degree at the University of Cape Town. In 1994, he qualified as a chartered accountant and completed an Executive Development Program at the Wharton Business School. In 2002, he moved to Australia. He has held executive and non-executive director positions at various companies and is a board member and co-founder of Talent's foundation, Talent RISE. In 2020, he was nominated by Deloitte as one of their Top 50 LGBTQIA+ leaders.

In 2018, Nielsen received CEO Magazine's CEO of the year award.

References 

1968 births
Living people
Australian business executives